Tuscaloosa County High School original building was completed in 1926. The first graduating class was summer of 1927. The Principal was Dr. Houston Cole, who later became President of Jacksonville State University.

The first student government for the school was organized in 1928. Hiram Darden was the first president. Secretary for that class was Inez Deal. The treasurer was Dan Whitson.

Built as a high school for the county, many rural county schools were closed. Due to this school being built, a county wide school busing system was enacted. Students were bused from many miles away in the county to the school. Students came from south, north and west rural sections of the county. Many of them from south Tuscaloosa County were bused across the City of Tuscaloosa to get to County High.

During the 1940s, the school building was the high point in local political rallies. Political rallies were held all across the county and only a few days before the election, a big county wide political rally was at County High.

The building, with an auditorium and stage, was also used for musical and cultural community performances.

This school is where Alabama’s first female Governor, Lurleen Burns Wallace, was a student.

Class of 1927 
The formal announcement and invitation for the first graduating class at Tuscaloosa County High School states:
Class of 1927, Tuscaloosa County High school, commencement exercises, Friday evening May 20 at 8 o’clock, High school auditorium.

The 1927 graduating class members were:
L C Bambarger, Vera Bell, Flora Clements, Lois Chism, Lula Christian, Milton Cooper, Sally Curry, Leonora Deason, Annie Belle Doughty, Brucie Lee Doughty, Mae Darden,Pauline Evans, Fred George,Hattie Hassel, Katherine Hardin, Mary Alice Johnson, Newell Shepherd, Leota Shirley, Catherine Thompson, and Chester Utley.

Leonora Deason was 1927 class president and was author and composer of words to The Tuscaloosa County High School Alma Mater.

Fred George, Class of 1927 
Always remembering his heritage, Fred George, a 1927 County High graduate, had great interest in talking about and recording our local history.

George was special in many ways, including that he was in the first graduating class of Tuscaloosa County High school in 1927. But also he had unrelenting interest in local history, especially early years at County High.

Born 1908 in the Coker community, he was the son of Willie Lewis and Alice Bonds George. He grew up in rural west Tuscaloosa County. He attended grade school in the Coker community. After Northport Education Board established and put into service a transporting system to bring students from rural county areas to the County High school, he attended school in Northport. His school graduating year of 1927 was special to him and he never forgot those who were a part of this class.

Fred George married September 1934 and had one child. George was employed at Alabama Bindery Company located in the Holt areas for many years before retirement. Mr. George died in 1995.

Class of 1928 
The first County High Band first played on March 22, 1928 as was written in The County High News.

Cecil Fields, Cornet
Elizabeth Adams
Dorothy Laycock, Cornet
Frances Bell, Clarinet
Maureen Palmer, Alto
Woodrow Clements, Alto
Kelly Bradley, Bass-Horn
Ralph Kilgore, Slide-Trombone
Roy Caldwell, Snare Drum
James Avery Adams, Baritone
Jim Caldwell
John Anders, Slide-Trombone
Unidentified
Carolyn Shepard, Clarinet
Everett Shepard, Cornet
(not pictured is Capt. Turner, director)

Others listed as being a part of the formation of the first band are teacher Mrs. Elizabeth Chenault (clarinet), Miss Johnson (clarinet), Snow Dell Powell (cornet), and Bellon Watson (bass-drum).

Class of 1935 
The Tuscaloosa News published a group photograph May 12, 1935 of the student body and senior class officers. Officers of the student body and senior class at Tuscaloosa County High school in Northport shown in a group picture.

Mary James, Secretary of the senior class, Hugh Grammar, Vice president of the student body, Beatrice McCullough, vice President of the senior class, George Hassel, 1936 president of the student body, Buddy Lemly, retiring president of the student body, and Eugene Hammer, president of the senior class.

Tuscaloosa County High School Honor Society for 1935 were also pictured in the May 1935 issue of The Tuscaloosa News. They were: Nell Deason, Evelyn Day, Secretary, Osco Clements, President, Wilma Wyatt, treasurer, Martha Hollis, Llawrence Webb, Lucille Maxwell, Hugh Grammer, Mary James, Buddy Lemly and Louise Dockery. The school Honor Society members are selected by school faculty for their outstanding record in school.

2000 - final year as a school 
County High was last used in December 2000. A new school about five miles north was completed and all functions of the school were transferred to the new school over the school break.

References

Defunct schools in Alabama
Schools in Tuscaloosa County, Alabama
Educational institutions established in 1926
1926 establishments in Alabama